Gopal Shankar Mishra (13 August 1999 - 1957 ) was an Indian musician and music teacher, who played the vichitra veena.

Early career
Mishra was invited to join the 1998 UK touring and Real World recording project made by State of Bengal and Ananda Shankar, Uday Shankar's son.

Growing up

Gopal was born in Kanpur, India in 1957. His sister, Ragini, was born some years later. His mother was called Padma. Surrounded by and growing up with a naturally musical culture, his interest deepened following an international tour with his father. He had studied vocal music and sitar since the age of four and was interested in cricket and other sports.

At the age of 15 his interest in music turned serious. His father introduced him to the industry in 1975 at Varanasi. Chhotelal Mishra, disciple of Pandit Anokhelal Mishra accompanied Gopal who performed a rendering of Marwa, with Chandrakauns and Pahadi on the sitar.

References

Sources 
1. Jacket note by Alan James, Out of Stillness Real World Compact Disc, April 2000

External links
Online Music Education
 Raga Vibodh: Misrabani. Dr. Ragini Trivedi. Hindi Madhyam Karyanvaya Nideshalaya: Delhi. 2010.
 Sitar Compositions in Ome Swarlipi. Dr. Ragini Trivedi. 2010.

1957 births
1999 deaths
Banaras Hindu University alumni
Hindustani instrumentalists
People from Kanpur
Performers of Hindu music
Real World Records artists
William Penn University faculty
Vichitra veena players
20th-century Indian singers
Singers from Uttar Pradesh